George Arthur Massey May (3 January 1875 – 22 March 1950) was an Australian rules footballer who played with St Kilda in the Victorian Football League (VFL).

References

External links 

1875 births
1950 deaths
Australian rules footballers from Melbourne
St Kilda Football Club players
People from Prahran, Victoria